Mohammed Amine El Bourkadi (born 22 February 1985) is a Moroccan professional footballer who plays as a goalkeeper for Spanish Regional Preferente club Tháder.

Club career
In 2019, El Bourkadi returned to his first club, Maghreb de Fès, after a 12-year absence where he played for various other clubs in Morocco.

On 29 October 2021, he joined Spanish Regional Preferente club Tháder.

International career
He has represented Morocco at under-23 level. He played for his country at the 2005 FIFA World Youth Championship, in which Morocco placed fourth.

Honours
Raja Casablanca
 Botola: 2008–09

References

1985 births
Living people
People from Fez, Morocco
Moroccan footballers
Moroccan expatriate footballers
Morocco under-20 international footballers
Association football goalkeepers
Raja CA players
Maghreb de Fès players
Olympique Club de Khouribga players
AS FAR (football) players
Wydad de Fès players
Botola players
Divisiones Regionales de Fútbol players
Expatriate footballers in Spain
Moroccan expatriate sportspeople in Spain
Morocco A' international footballers
2016 African Nations Championship players